Solly Krieger (March 28, 1909 – September 24, 1964) was an American middleweight boxer who fought from 1928–1941.  He held the NBA World Middleweight Championship in 1938–39. Krieger, who was Jewish, was inducted into the International Jewish Sports Hall of Fame.

Early life
Krieger was born on March 28, 1909 in the Williamsburg section of Brooklyn, New York. He attended Eastern District High School, and was active in baseball, football, basketball, and soccer, but preferred boxing to his other sports. His father, who was born in Poland and was initially a tailor, was religiously observant, and had strong opposition to his son Solly's youthful desire to pursue boxing as a career.

Krieger was a Golden Gloves champion in his amateur career.  In 1928, turning professional, he was mentored by the legendary Hymie Caplan, who had also coached Syd Terris, Ruby Goldstein, and Al Singer.

Early boxing career
Between 1928–31, he won eighteen four to six round bouts in clubs, with an impressive nine by knockout.  He lost only twice to Jose Rodriguez on August 15, 1929, and Joey LeGrey, on May 26, 1930.

Very early in his career he was known as a cautious boxer with strong defensive skills. After surgery for an injured left elbow, the result of a handball accident, he lost his ability to jab with his left hand, and found the need to develop more powerful blows. As a result, he became a more free wheeling heavy hitter with a very strong left hook. As he was relatively short armed but powerful for a middleweight, he preferred to box on the inside and from clinches where his reach was not a disadvantage.

In June 1931, after Mickey Walker relinquished the title, there was no universally recognized World Champion to fill his shoes.

On October 16, 1931, Krieger was knocked out for the first time in his career by future 1933 Middleweight Champion Vince Dundee in Madison Square Garden in eight of ten rounds.

In 1934, having problems with his arm, he fought only twice.  The surgery he had to correct the problem removed calcium deposits, but left him with a left arm slightly shorter than his right.  He adopted a style that allowed him to have his best years in 1935–36 winning with great frequency and utilizing his strength, counterpunching, and defensive skills.  On October 22, 1936, he won an exciting twelve round match against Oscar Rankins in Pittsburgh, Pennsylvania. Describing how he  could appear to be taking a beating in a fight like the one with Rankins, while actually avoiding or blocking most of the blows coming his way, he once said, "I started walking in on my opponents but I countered.  People used to think I was taking a beating, but I could weave while standing still...I'd walk in and look like I was a punching bag half the time, but I'd never get hit. That operation (on left arm) was the turning point of my life."   The Pittsburgh Press noted how Krieger appeared to be taking serious punishment in the Rankin fight, but came back stronger.  It wrote "From a mile behind to a mile in front came Krieger after the Coast colored boy (Rankin) tired, principally from rocking right hands off Solly's chin and sinking both hands deep in his body.  And when he came there was no stopping. Unmarked, despite being a perfect target in the early rounds..."  Many newspapers considered the fight one of the greatest middleweight bouts of all time.

Mid boxing career
In 1937, the New York State Athletic Commission named Frank Apolstoli and Solly Krieger number one, and number two respectively in their divisions. To determine which boxer would reign as the number one middleweight, Krieger and Apostoli fought on April 4, 1937, at the Hippodrome in New York.  Suffering from a deep cut in his lower lip, Krieger had to discontinue the fight, resulting in a TKO in the fifth round. Doctor William Walker made the determination to end the bout at the end of the fifth but had considered ending the fight in the prior round.  Krieger had previously lost to Apostoli on February 17, 1937 on points in an exciting ten round bout at the Hippodrome.  Both bouts were a setback for Krieger, but not an end to his quest for the title.

Krieger had three important bouts with Billy Conn, who would take the Light Heavyweight Championship after their last bout.  In their first bout on December 16, 1937, he won decisively by unanimous decision in Pittsburgh in twelve rounds.  Billy Conn later said of the bout, "This guy Krieger was the toughest...I ever fought.  I ached for a week after my first fight with him. He could lick anything around now."  In their second bout on November 28, 1938, again in Duquesne Gardens, in Pittsburgh, Krieger lost by unanimous decision in twelve rounds.

In 1938, Krieger won five straight knockouts, starting with George Black, and Al Diamond in one round, Johnny Rossi in four, and then Stanley Hasrato in seven.  In his knockout against Izzy Jannazzo, on April 6, 1938 at the Hippodrome, Krieger effectively used strong body blows to win the fight, but did not gain the eleventh-round TKO until his "wild punches" began to land. Janazzo had neither the reach nor the skills of Conn or Hostak who were both over four inches taller than Solly. 
In his May 20, 1938 loss to Glen Lee at Madison Square Garden, Krieger lost all but one round in the opinion of the Milwaukee Journal, despite a recent layoff by Lee.  Krieger's loss to a boxer who had no advantage in reach did not bode well for his upcoming fight with the more skilled and slightly taller Freddie Steele. The Journal also noted that Lee was able to send hooks to Krieger throughout the bout, indicating that Solly was having trouble defending during infighting.

Krieger had a setback against ranked opponent and reigning NBA World Middleweight Title holder Freddie Steele, on June 14, 1938 in a ten-round loss by unanimous decision in Seattle, Washington.  Continuing to fight in California, he came back with impressive wins against Swede Bergland, Ace of Spades, and Dale Spar, gaining the positive press he needed to push a title match.

Winning the World Middleweight Championship

Before meeting Krieger in their first title fight, Al Hostak knocked out 17 straight opponents.  Hostak's mastery of boxing and powerful punching capability was clearly evident.  Nonetheless, on November 1, 1938, at Civic Stadium in Seattle, Washington, Krieger won the National Boxing Association World Middleweight Championship in a 15-round majority decision over the reigning champion. The fighting was fierce on both sides but the crowd of 9,000 were surprised to see Krieger gaining the victory. The Spokesman wrote Krieger raised big red welts on Hostak's left side from terrific right hooks," and that "Several times Hostak tried to use his left, then winced and reeled, apparently because of paralysis of the left side." The Spokesman also noted that Hostak was the favorite in the pre-fight betting.  It wrote, "Krieger, a rough, tough, infighter at his best against hard punchers, took the offensive almost from the start, and from the sixth round it was apparent the Seattle Slav (Hostak) was in for a busy evening."  After the fight, Hostak was sent to a local emergency room to be treated for his paralysis.  According to the Southeast Missourian, Hostak was "temporarily blinded" from swelling caused by Krieger's repeated blows to his face and eyes.

After his win over Hostak, Krieger's coach Hymie Caplan made an understandable decision to forgo any challenger a title shot for a six-month period.  Krieger fought over the 160 pound middleweight limit for nearly all of this period, and had a difficult time getting back down to 160 for the Hostak rematch.  He still fought regularly after he captured the title from Hostak, facing Billy Conn twice in tough losses, as well as Carmen Bath, Red Farmer, Marty Simmons, Ben Brown, and Alan Matthews.  In the Matthews bout on April 5, 1939, Krieger effectively used infighting, with close body blows and hooks to defeat an opponent who was less a threat than Hostak or Steele.  According to the Spokesman Review, both the knockdowns he obtained in the bout with Matthews were from hooks which required him to get in fairly close to his opponent.  Notably, Matthews had only a two-inch height advantage over Krieger.  Inside blows would be more difficult to execute with an opponent having greater defensive skills and a longer reach.

Harsh loss to Billy Conn before title rematch
In his final fight with Billy Conn on May 12, 1939, Krieger lost again in twelve rounds by unanimous decision in front of a sizable audience in Madison Square Garden.  Though outweighing Krieger by only four pounds in the bout, Conn was significantly nine years younger and five inches taller, giving him an important advantage in reach, and probably in endurance as well.  As evidence of Conn's superior strength and conditioning, he would take the Light Heavyweight Title on July 13, 1939, only two months after his bout with Krieger.  The Milwaukee Journal noted that Krieger was unable to fight effectively inside, possibly due to his shorter reach.  The Journal wrote "Conn handled his rival as though he were little more than an animated punching bag for 11 of the 12 rounds.  Using a left hand to the face which rarely missed its mark, Conn dominated the proceedings almost completely at long range."  It also noted that even in the eleventh when Krieger was able to connect with shots to the midsection, "Conn kept out of range and came up for the twelfth...as fresh as when he started."   In a recap of the fight, the Luddington Daily News, wrote "Solly tried so hard it almost hurt to watch him. He lunged at his nimble rival round after round, swinging for dear life, but all he got for his most heroic efforts was a painful beating..."

Any injuries sustained in this loss may have given Krieger a disadvantage in the title fight he lost to Hostak only a month and a half later.  In fact, the Milwaukee Journal, writing in anticipation of Krieger's rematch with Hostak, noted "The champion (Krieger) was on the short end of 10 to 7 odds," and noted that "the beating Krieger took awhile back from Billy Conn didn't do him any good."  One source gave nine rounds to Conn in the fight, and noted "There wasn't a knockdown, though it was strange that Solly kept his feet under the barrage of left-rights that poured into his granite jaw in the late rounds."    After taking what might have been one of the most brutal losses of his career, Krieger gained nearly twelve pounds in the six weeks before his title fight.

Losing the Middleweight Championship
In a rematch in Civic Stadium in Seattle, Hostak regained the championship on June 27, 1939, in front of a larger hometown crowd estimated at over 15,000.  Kreiger struggled to make weight for the bout. By the  account of The Seattle Post-Intelligencer, Krieger was a mere shadow of the fighter who had won the title. Hostak easily won, knocking Krieger down twice in the third and again twice in the fourth round.  Krieger was down for counts of seven and nine in the third, and for another count of nine in the fourth.  He rose only briefly after the count to be knocked down again by a flurry of blows from Hostak.  The referee, heavyweight champion James Braddock, did not perform a count, but ended the fight after the second knockdown, forty-six seconds into the fourth round.  It was Krieger's first title fight after beating Hostak seven months earlier. The Milwaukee Journal wrote that in the fourth round, "Krieger, his eyes glazed and staring, slumped to the canvas in midring and sat there in a stupor for several seconds before his handlers trundled him to his corner." After the defeat, Krieger attributed his loss to the difficult task he had losing twenty pounds in a month to make weight, and the terrific right hand of Hostak.

Boxing in the heavyweight division
After his loss of the title, Kreiger moved up to Light Heavyweight.  He fought thirteen fights in the heavyweight division gaining victories in 1940 against Texas Joe Dundee, Mario Liani, Herbi Katz, Jarl Johnson, and Wally Sears.    He fought his last fight as a Heavyweight, against Lee Savold, a serious world heavyweight contender, in July 1941, his fifth loss in his final six fights.

Personal life
Krieger was married to Sally Keisler, and had two children, Lawrence and Karen.

Professional boxing record

Retirement and life after boxing
Krieger retired from boxing in 1941. Not long after his last fight, he ran for City Councilman for the Bensonhurst section of Brooklyn where he lived, but lost the election. He took financial losses from gambling, before investing in a tavern which did not succeed.  He later worked for the restaurant Pumpernick's in Miami Beach as a parking attendant. He died in Las Vegas on September 24, 1964.

Achievements

See also
List of select Jewish boxers

Further reading
 Blady, Ken, The Jewish Boxers' Hall of Fame, (1988). Shapolsky Publishers, Inc, New York, pgs. 237-41.

References

External links
 

1909 births
1964 deaths
Sportspeople from Brooklyn
Boxers from New York City
Jewish American boxers
Jewish boxers
Middleweight boxers
World boxing champions
World middleweight boxing champions
American male boxers
People from Williamsburg, Brooklyn
Eastern District High School alumni
20th-century American Jews